Low Marks Again (translated as Grade D, Again) is a painting by Fyodor Pavlovich Reshetnikov, produced in 1952.

Due to the work's realistic scenario, the Soviet school curriculum used the painting as a topic for essay-writing. The painting was well known to the Soviet public.

Subject 

The painting depicts a family meeting a boy who came home from school with a failing grade of D. The boy stands with his clothes unbuttoned, with wrinkled coat, pants, and black shoes. In his right hand he holds a tied bag that seems to have served as both a ball and a sled to its owner, with a pair of old skates sticking out. His blond hair is rumpled, his protruding ears are red, ruddy from skating in the cold air, which does not align with his disappointed face. He sighs and his entire appearance is an act of faking "genuine" sadness because of his failing grade. The boy is joyfully greeted by a dog, very fond of the boy, as if to say: "Come and play with me."

On the right side, his mother sits down, as if pausing her housework. Seeing his face, sad but flushed from the cold, she has realized that the boy has played on the street and is not really worried about receiving low marks. The mother is tired and upset as she realizes that her son does not put in enough effort. Holding her hands in her lap, she does not know how to influence her lazy son. Next to the mother is the younger brother on his bike, laughing at the older brother, knowing full well what is going on.

At the dinner table, the older sister is doing homework. She stands up, looking reproachfully at her sloppy brother. Her posture, the turn of her head, and the bright red scarf of a Communist "Pioneer" (like a Soviet Eagle Scout), all testify that she does not approve of her brother's behavior. Her figure is prominently displayed as a dark silhouette in a bright doorway. The window behind her creates a dual lighting pattern and symbolizes her own bright future. The disappointed reaction of the family is in stark contrast with the sincere joy of the animal, which exaggerates the importance of something as trivial as a school grade.

"Low Marks Again" contains a reproduction of Reshetnikov's painting "Arrived on vacation" (1948) on the one of the walls. The artist also used a reproduction of "Low marks again" in his later painting "Reexamination".

References 
 Classic art catalog, in Russian
 Art experts discuss this painting, in Russian

1952 paintings
Soviet paintings
Collections of the Tretyakov Gallery
Paintings of people
Paintings of children
Dogs in art